Lemonade Tycoon 2 is the sequel to Lemonade Tycoon. This game contains more features, improved graphics, and is set in New York City, unlike its predecessor. Also, this version allowed the player to have more than one stand and the ability to have stands in more than one location at once.

Lemonade Tycoon 2 revolves around selling lemonade for a profit. The player can buy upgrades to make customers happier and make lemonade faster.

Game modes
Lemonade Tycoon 2 has three modes:
Time Challenge
Money Challenge
Career

Locations
Lemonade Tycoon has 19 locations where a stand can be located, which include The Bronx, Brooklyn, Greenwich Village, Central Park, Times Square, Statue of Liberty, and Grand Central Station.

2004 video games
Business simulation games
MacOS games
MumboJumbo games
Single-player video games
Video game sequels
Video games about food and drink
Video games developed in the United States
Video games set in New York City
Windows games
JAMDAT Mobile games